At least two warships of Japan have borne the name Kaga:

 Japanese aircraft carrier Kaga, an aircraft carrier of the Imperial Japanese Navy, named after the province.
 JS Kaga (DDH-184), a helicopter carrier of the Japan Maritime Self-Defense Force, named after the province.

Japanese Navy ship names